Damian Halata (born 8 August 1962) is a German former professional football player and manager. Born in Poland, he represented the East Germany national team internationally.

Club career
Halata was born in Świętochłowice, Silesia, Poland. He spent his senior career at two clubs, playing 267 DDR-Oberliga matches for 1. FC Magdeburg (1975–1988) and 1. FC Lokomotive Leipzig (1988–91). He also appeared in 14 matches on the European level for the two clubs.

In October 1988, Halata managed to score five goals in one game against BSG Sachsenring Zwickau. After qualifying for 2. Bundesliga with Lok Leipzig, Halata suffered an injury in the first match of the 1991–92 season that ended his playing career.

International career
Halata played four matches for East Germany, scoring once. As part of East Germany's Olympic team he qualified for the 1984 Summer Olympics, but did not participate in the Games, due to the Soviet-led boycott. Altogether, Halata appeared in 30 matches with the Olympic squad during qualification.

Managerial career
After his playing career, Halata became assistant manager of VfB Leipzig, working under managers Jürgen Sundermann and Bernd Stange. Aged 31, on 9 April 1994, he took over as interim manager, when Leipzig were assured relegation from the Bundesliga.
Between 1 July 1994 and 30 April 1996, he returned to the role of assistant manager, until he was made interim manager once more on 1 May 1996. This time he prevented the club's relegation from 2. Bundesliga. After again returning to his duties as assistant manager in the following season, Halata was once more given the task to save VfB Leipzig from relegation on 7 December 1997, but he could not prevent the club's relegation at the end of the season.
From 8 December 1998 to February 1999, he was manager of 1. FC Dynamo Dresden, staying at the club as assistant manager until 14 March 2001.

On 1 January 2002, he took over as manager of ZFC Meuselwitz, then on a relegation spot in the fifth-tier Landesliga Thüringen. He secured non-relegation, then finished second in 2003 before winning promotion to the NOFV-Oberliga in 2004. In their first season, Meuselwitz finished sixth. After a disappointing start to the 2005–06 season, Halata stepped down as manager of Meuselwitz, only to rescind his decision days later. He stayed at the helm until June 2006, leading the club to a 5th place.

On 22 March 2007, Halata took over as manager of SV Dessau 05 in the NOFV-Oberliga. In December 2007, Halata returned as manager of ZFC Meuselwitz, signing a contract until June 2012.

References

External links
 
 Damian Halata at lok-leipzig-db.com

1962 births
People from Świętochłowice
Sportspeople from Silesian Voivodeship
Living people
Polish emigrants to East Germany
German footballers
East German footballers
East Germany international footballers
1. FC Magdeburg players
1. FC Lokomotive Leipzig players
2. Bundesliga players
German football managers
1. FC Lokomotive Leipzig managers
Dynamo Dresden managers
Dynamo Dresden non-playing staff
DDR-Oberliga players
Association football forwards